During the Philippine Revolution, various flags were used by the Katipunan secret society and its various factions, and later, after the Katipunan's dissolution, the Philippine Army and its civil government.

Other flags were the personal battle standards of different military zone commanders operating around Manila.

Flags

Katipunan

Personal flags

Other flags

National flags

"Evolution of the Philippine Flag" set 

A set of flag purportedly used by the Katipunan, dubbed as the "Evolution of the Philippine", has been featured in postal stamps in the 1972 and the Philippine Centennial. The name of the set erroneously suggest that the modern Flag of the Philippines was derived or "evolved" from the flags used by the Katipunan and all of the flags themselves were national flags. The Manila Historical Institute and the National Historical Institute insist that the flags in the set, excluding the modern Philippine flag, are "Flags of the Philippine Revolution". Historians also questioned the limited number of flags included in the set. It is pointed out that the "Evolution of the Philippine Flag" set only represents a small fraction of flags used by Katipunan battalions. The set also included flags which had limited documentation to support its actual historical usage.

Modern usage 

A flag reminiscent of the Katipunan flags of the past was used by a breakaway faction of army officers calling themselves Bagong Katipuneros, but labeled the Magdalo Group by the press. These officers mutinied against the government of Gloria Macapagal Arroyo at the behest of Gregorio Honasan and once again led by Antonio Trillanes IV (see Oakwood mutiny and Manila Peninsula mutiny).

References

External links
"Philippines – Historical Flags." Flags of the World.

Philippine Revolution
Philippine Revolution
Philippine Revolution